Ezequiel Pérez Companc (born 5 July 1994 in Buenos Aires) is an Argentine racing driver. He currently competes in the Blancpain GT World Challenge Europe for Belgian Audi Club Team WRT.

Stint in Extreme E
Companc will race in Extreme E for the Energy X-Prix in Uruguay.

Racing record

Career summary

24 Hours of Spa-Francorchamps results

FIA GT Nations Cup results

References

External links

Profile at Driver Database

Argentine racing drivers
1994 births
Living people
International GT Open drivers
Blancpain Endurance Series drivers
ADAC GT Masters drivers
WeatherTech SportsCar Championship drivers
AF Corse drivers
W Racing Team drivers
Team Lazarus drivers
Starworks Motorsport drivers
Sports car racing team owners
Extreme E drivers
24H Series drivers
Ferrari Challenge drivers